Marie Chapian (also known as Marie Giordano and Marie Jordan) is an American writer and radio ministry host. She is known for her writings on Christian diet programs, Christian devotional literature, and co-authoring biographies.

Career 
Chapian is known for her Christian writings, health and fitness writings, and co-authoring autobiographies. She has also written one novel, I love you like a tomato which she published as Marie Giordano. She has written a series of books about Christian diet programs, including Free to Be Thin that she co-authored with Neva Coyle in 1979. A second edition, All new free to be thin was published in 1994, along with There's more to being thin than being thin. She created the Blessercize aerobics video, Fun To Be Fit, which is set to Christian music. Chapian has written Christian devotional books, including Mothers & daughters  and His thoughts towards me that was published in English and Russian. In 1988 she won a Gold Medallion book award from the Evangelical Christian Publishers Association for her book Am I the only one here with faded genes?. She has won the Cornerstone Book of the Year Award and a Silver Angel Award.

Chapian has co-authored biographies. Cathleen Mae Webb agreed to write a book with Chapian about why she withdrew her charges of rape and kidnapping against Gary Dotson. The resulting book, Forgive Me, was published in 1985. She also co-authored books with Gavin MacLeod and Robert Sadler.

Selected publications

References

External links
 Official website

20th-century American novelists
American children's writers
American family and parenting writers
American historical novelists
American women psychologists
21st-century American psychologists
American psychotherapists
American spiritual writers
American women poets
American women novelists
Christian novelists
Living people
Metropolitan State University alumni
Moody Bible Institute alumni
University of Minnesota alumni
Writers from California
Year of birth missing (living people)
American women children's writers
20th-century American women writers
20th-century American poets
20th-century American biographers
American women biographers
Women historical novelists
21st-century American women